Suvarna Jha is an Indian television actress who played Tripti Virani in Kyunki Saas Bhi Kabhi Bahu Thi.

Career 
Suvarna Jha was also a part of a 2003 Bollywood movie Sssshhh. It was Farah Khan, the daughter of the yesteryear Bollywood actor Sanjay Khan who offered her role in a show titled 'Jannat' which was broadcast on Channel Nine Gold. She played the character of Zoya in that Muslim social drama. Soon after she was offered a role in Dekho Magar Pyaar Se, which was to be aired on the Star Plus channel. She hosted LUX Kaun Jeetega Bollywood Ka Ticket which aired on 9X. In 2005 she began to play the role of Mishti in Kaisa Ye Pyar Hai, and in 2006–07 she played the role of Karuna in Kasamh Se.

References

Indian television actresses
Living people
Year of birth missing (living people)
Actresses from Mumbai